Darchaq (also Romanized as Darchāq) is a village in Bajestan Rural District, in the Central District of Bajestan County, Razavi Khorasan Province, Iran. At the 2006 census, its population was 21, in 6 families.

References 

Populated places in Bajestan County